Moyasimon is a manga series written and illustrated by Masayuki Ishikawa. It started serialization in Kodansha's seinen magazine Evening in August 2004. On June 22, 2013, it moved to Kodansha's magazine Morning two and ran in that magazine until January 2014. Kodansha published 13 tankōbon volumes between May 23, 2005, and March 20, 2014. Del Rey Manga licensed the manga in September 2008, and released volume one in English in North America in November 2009, with volume two released on June 22, 2010.


Volume list

References

Moyashimon
Moyashimon